Moss on the Stones is a 1968 Austrian drama film directed by Georg Lhotsky. The Austrian academic Robert von Dassanowsky said it was one of the most remarkable and memorable Austrian films of the 1960s. The film was selected as the Austrian entry for the Best Foreign Language Film at the 42nd Academy Awards, but was not accepted as a nominee.

Cast
 Fritz Muliar as The Architect
 Erika Pluhar as Julia
 Louis Ries as Mehlmann
 Johannes Schauer as Karl
 Heinz Trixner as Petrik
 Wilfried Zeller-Zellenberg as The Baron

See also
 List of submissions to the 42nd Academy Awards for Best Foreign Language Film
 List of Austrian submissions for the Academy Award for Best Foreign Language Film

References

External links
 

1968 films
1968 drama films
1960s German-language films
Austrian drama films
Films directed by Georg Lhotsky
Films based on Austrian novels